Cam Henderson is an Australian singer and songwriter. Originating from Geelong, Victoria, Henderson rose to fame after placing second on the fourth series of Australia's Got Talent in 2010 and performed at the 2010 AFL Grand Final.

Career

2010: Australia's Got Talent
In 2010, Henderson and his son Taylor auditioned for the fourth series of Australia's Got Talent as a guitar and singing duo called Father & Son. After they sang Michael Jackson's "Man in the Mirror" during the audition, judge Brian McFadden suggested that the pair should be solo artists. Cam eventually placed second, with Taylor finishing third.

Henderson released Angel Without Wings in October 2010, which peaked at number 29 on the ARIA charts.

Discography

Charting albums

References

Living people
Australian country singers
Australian folk singers
Australian songwriters
Musicians from Victoria (Australia)
Australia's Got Talent contestants
21st-century Australian singers
21st-century Australian male singers
Year of birth missing (living people)
People from Geelong